Stanley Eugene Hubbard (June 26, 1897 - December 27, 1992) was an American businessman, the founder of Hubbard Broadcasting.

Early life
Stanley E. Hubbard was born on June 26, 1897, in Red Wing, Minnesota, the son of Frank Valentine Hubbard and Minnie L Ayer. He was an aviator during World War I.

Career
Hubbard took up flying in 1916, started a few airlines, and opened an airport in Louisville, Kentucky. He bought his first radio station in 1923. In 1943, he helped to organize the Metropolitan Airport Commission. In 1948, he started his first TV station.

His son Stanley S. Hubbard started working for Hubbard Broadcasting in 1951, became president in 1967, and chairman and CEO in 1983.

Personal life
His son Stanley Stub Hubbard was born in 1933.

Stanley Eugene Hubbard died on December 27, 1992.

Awards

In 2014, he was inducted into the National Radio Hall of Fame.

References

1897 births
1992 deaths
People from Red Wing, Minnesota